Sanity Fair is a festival that takes place each year in the city of Stoke-on-Trent, England. The reason for the day is to tackle the issues of mental illness, raise awareness, and celebrate emotional well-being.

Information 
Sanity Fair began in 2001 as a small event held mainly indoors. Each year around 30 stores are placed around with information available. There is also a band that plays on the live stage that is placed at the bottom of Piccadilly, in which a parade marches through the streets of Hanley.

Sources and external links 
Official website

Culture in Stoke-on-Trent
Mental health in the United Kingdom
Festivals in Staffordshire